Kinda Vivianne Ingrosso (née Hamid; born 1982), better known as Kinnda, is a Swedish artist and songwriter. Kinnda is also known as Kee Hamid, Kee Ingrosso, or just Kee. Kinnda has been married to Swedish house producer Sebastian Ingrosso since 2011.

Songwriting
 David Guetta Featuring Rihanna - "Who's That Chick?" (2010)
 Bob Sinclar - "Rock the Boat" (2011)
 Jennifer Lopez Featuring Pitbull - "On the Floor" (2011)
 Alesso - "Falling" (2017)
 Salvatore Ganacci - "Talk" (2017)

Discography

Albums
 Kinnda (2001)

Singles
 "Freak You Out" (#12 in Sweden).
 "Lovestruck"
 "Don't Bring Sand to the Beach"
 "Give It All U Got" with Lil Jon and Tinchy Stryder (2009)

References

1982 births
Living people
People from Uppsala
Swedish pop singers
20th-century Swedish women singers
21st-century Swedish women singers